Energy in North Korea describes energy and electricity production, consumption and import in North Korea.

North Korea is a net energy exporter. Primary energy use in North Korea was 224 TWh and 9 TWh per million people in 2009. The country's primary sources of power are coal and hydro, after Kim Jong-il implemented plans that saw the construction of large hydroelectric power stations across the country.

According to the 2019 CIA World Factbook, only 26% of North Korea’s population has access to electricity. Many households are restricted to 2 hours' power per day due to priority being given to manufacturing plants.

Overview

Per capita electricity consumption
According to statistics compiled by the South Korean agency, Statistics Korea, based on International Energy Agency (IEA) data, per capita electricity consumption fell from its peak in 1990 of 1247 kilowatt hours to a low of 712 kilowatt hours in 2000. It has slowly risen since to 819 kilowatt hours in 2008, a level below that of 1970.

In 2017 many homes were using small standalone photovoltaic systems. In 2019 it was estimated 55% of North Korean households used solar panels.

By 2019, electricity production had reached a level where any supply blackouts were of relatively short durations.

Oil imports 
North Korea imports crude oil from an aging pipeline that originates in Dandong, China. The crude oil is refined at the Ponghwa Chemical Factory in Sinuiju, North Korea. North Korea has a smaller oil refinery, the Sŭngri Refinery, on its Russian border. The country had been able to import oil from China and the Soviet Union for below market prices, but with the end of the Cold War, these deals were not renewed, leading to an explosive rise in oil prices for Pyongyang and a drop in imports.

North Korea imports jet fuel, diesel fuel, and gasoline from two refineries in Dalian, China, which arrive at the North Korean port of Nampo.

Power facilities 
North Korea is reliant on hydro power, which leads to shortages in winter, when there is little rainfall and ice blocks the flow of rivers.
Power plants that were never completed/ started up are shown in

See also 
Mining in North Korea
Nuclear power in North Korea
Economy of North Korea

References

Further reading

External links

 
Government of North Korea
Korea-related lists